Faculty of Science (東京大学理学部) is one of the 10 constituent faculties, and Graduate School of Science (東京大学大学院理学系研究科) is one of the constituent 15 graduate schools at University of Tokyo. The faculty and the graduate school operate as one with the exception of mathematics and computer science. Founded in 1877, Faculty of Science is one of the oldest 4 faculties (Science, Medicine, Law and Letters) of the University of Tokyo.

Faculty of Science and Graduate School of Science have produced 5 or 6 Nobel laureates (Esaki, Koshiba, Nanbu, Kajita, Osumi, Manabe) and one Fields Medallist (Kodaira).

Organization

Faculty of Science (Undergraduate Departments) 

 Departments:
 Mathematics (UG) - affiliated with Graduate School of Mathematical Sciences
 Information Science (UG) - affiliated with Graduate School of Information Science and Technology
 Physics (UG)
 Astronomy (UG)
 Earth and Planetary Physics (UG)
 Earth and Planetary Environmental Science (UG)
 Chemistry (UG)
 Biophysics and Biochemistry (UG)
 Biological Sciences (UG)
 Zoology course
 Botany course
 Anthropology course
 Bioinformatics and Systems Biology (UG)

Graduate School of Science (Graduate Departments) 

 Departments:
 Physics (GR)
 Astronomy (GR)
 Earth and Planetary Science (GR)
 Chemistry (GR)
 Biological Sciences (GR)

Affiliated Facilities 

 Koishikawa Botanical Garden
 Nikko Botanical Garden
 The Misaki Marine Biological Station (MMBS)
 Research Centre for Spectrochemistry (RCS)
 Geochemical Research Center (GRC)
 Institute of Astronomy (IoA)
 Kiso Observatory
 Center for Nuclear Study (CNS)
 Research Center for the Early Universe (RESCEU)
 Center for Attosecond Laser Science
 Molecular Genetics Research Laboratory (MGRL)
 Institute for Photon Science and Technology
 Universal Biology Institute (UBI)
 UTokyo Organization for Planetary and Space Science
 Institute for Physics of Intelligence

See also 

 Faculty of Engineering and Graduate School of Engineering, University of Tokyo
 Graduate School of Information Science and Technology, University of Tokyo
 Graduate School of Mathematical Sciences, University of Tokyo
 Graduate School of Interdisciplinary Information Studies, University of Tokyo

References

External links 

 SCHOOL OF SCIENCE THE UNIVERSITY OF TOKYO

University of Tokyo